The Chemist may refer to:

The Chemist (band), a band formed in Perth, Western Australia in 2007.
The Chemist (film), a 1936 film.
 The Chemist, a 2016 novel by Stephenie Meyer.

See also
 The Qemists, a British Drum & Bass band